Lamp rerating is modelling the predicted properties of a filament lamp when running the lamp at a voltage other than its specified rating, using  a power law function of voltage. The following equations can be used to estimate the new operating point. The exact value of the exponent parameters will typically vary slightly with the particular lamp design.

Va = Applied voltage
Vd = Design voltage

Rerated current = (Va/Vd)0.55 × current at design voltage  
Rerated luminous intensity = (Va/Vd)3.4 to 3.5 × Luminous intensity at design voltage 
Rerated life = (Va/Vd)−12 to -16 × Life at design voltage 
Rerated electrical power = (Va/Vd)1.6 × Electrical power at design voltage 
Rerated color temperature = (Va/Vd)0.42 × Color temperature at design voltage

See also
Incandescent light bulb#Light output and lifetime, which has much more detail.
Halogen lamp#Effect of voltage on performance, for halogen lamps.

References

Incandescent light bulbs